Zeis may refer to:

Adam Zeis (born 1978), American writer and podcaster
Gland of Zeis sebaceous gland located on the margin of the eyelid
Eduard Zeis (1807–1868), German surgeon and ophthalmologist

See also 
Zeiss (disambiguation)